BSF School Jalndhar Cant is an institution providing education in India. It is situated in the BSF Campus Jalandhar Cantt. The school is affiliated to the Central Board of Secondary Education (CBSE) India.

Overview
The infrastructure of the school includes the school building along with a football ground, basketball court, hockey ground, badminton court and tennis court. The school comes under the  authority of the Border Security Force Punjab.

See also
BSF

References

Private schools in Punjab, India
Education in Jalandhar
1967 establishments in Punjab, India
Educational institutions established in 1967